Dobryatino is a rural locality (a settlement) and the administrative center of Posyolok Dobryatino, Gus-Khrustalny District, Vladimir Oblast, Russia. The population was 1,798 as of 2010. There are 15 streets.

Geography 
Dobryatino is located 62 km southeast of Gus-Khrustalny (the district's administrative centre) by road. Makhinsky is the nearest rural locality.

References 

Rural localities in Gus-Khrustalny District